The 5th District Appellate Court is located in Mount Vernon, Illinois, an incorporated town in Jefferson County.  The building was originally constructed for the southern division of the Illinois Supreme Court, which was created by the 1848 Illinois constitution. Construction on the Greek Revival building began in 1854. Illinois' 1870 constitution established appellate courts, and this building then shared space with the fourth district until 1897 when all supreme court sessions moved to Springfield.  The building presently houses the 5th District Appellate Court.

This building has been on the National Register of Historic Places since July 2, 1973. It is one of two sites on the National Register in Jefferson County; the other, in the village of Belle Rive, is the C. H. Judd House.

Notes

Government buildings completed in 1854
Buildings and structures in Jefferson County, Illinois
Courthouses on the National Register of Historic Places in Illinois
National Register of Historic Places in Jefferson County, Illinois
State appellate courts of the United States
1850s architecture in the United States
1854 establishments in Illinois
Courts and tribunals established in 1854